The Constitution of the State of Washington is the document that describes the structure and function of the government of the U.S. State of Washington. The constitution was adopted as part of Washington Territory's path to statehood in 1889. An earlier constitution was drafted and ratified in 1878, but it was never officially adopted.

1878 constitution
In 1877 Orange Jacobs, Washington Territory's Delegate to U.S. Congress, requested an enabling act that would allow Washington to become a state as soon as a state constitution was drafted and ratified by the voters. At the same time, an act was passed by the Washington Territorial Legislative Assembly to convene a constitutional convention. Without waiting for action by Congress, Washington's voters elected fifteen delegates who met in Walla Walla in June and July 1878 and drafted a constitution.

The voters of the territory approved the constitution in November 1878 with a vote of 6,537 in favor and 3,236 opposed. Congress, however, did not pass the statehood bill introduced by Jacobs. Washington Territory's next Delegate, Thomas H. Brents, also failed to get a statehood bill passed with the 1878 constitution. Later statehood bills abandoned the 1878 constitution and instead called for a state constitutional convention.

Although never approved by Congress, the 1878 constitution is an important historical document which shows the political thinking of the time. It was used extensively during the drafting of Washington State's 1889 constitution, the one and only official Constitution of the State of Washington.

1889 constitution
In December 1888, Congress introduced an act to enable Washington, North Dakota, South Dakota, and Montana to become states. Among other requirements in the Enabling Act of 1889, Congress asked each prospective state to draft and ratify a state constitution.

An election was held to choose 75 delegates to frame a constitution for the State of Washington. The elected delegates assembled on July 4, 1889, in the Territorial Capitol Building in Olympia and labored through the summer to draft a constitution that would form the basis for all future Washington laws. On August 23, 1889, the convention concluded its work. Miles C. Moore, the last governor of Washington Territory, called for an election to be held on October 1, 1889, to ratify the state constitution and elect the officers of the new state government. A vote of 40,152 to 11,879 approved the Washington State Constitution.

A certified copy of the Constitution of the State of Washington was sent by courier to President Harrison whose approval was necessary before Washington was proclaimed a state. Days went by with no word; finally on November 4, 1889, a message was received, stating that Governor Moore forgot to sign the Constitution and President Harrison could not approve it. Overnight a new copy was prepared, and it was sent to the President by courier the next day. On November 11, 1889, the President issued a proclamation declaring Washington's Constitution approved, and the state was admitted to the Union.

See also
 Washington Senate Joint Resolution 8200
 Law of Washington (state)

References

 . Reprinted from the Washington Historical Quarterly, 1918–1919.
 

Much of this article is adapted from material copied from the website of the Washington Secretary of State, a public domain resource; see About the Office:  Web Sites Privacy Policy under Public Domain & Copyright Information.

Further reading

External links

Washington Constitution: Full text of the Washington Constitution provided by the Washington State Legislature

Washington (state) law
Washington